Belén Scalella (born August 19, 1981 in Buenos Aires) is an Argentine actress and singer. She is known for her television roles of Belén Menendez Pacheco in Rebelde Way and Belu in El Refugio (de los Sueños). As a member of music group Rolabogan, she recorded one album, also titled Rolabogan (2006).

Personal life 
Scalella has never specified her date of birth. She stated she was born in 1982, and Leo as her horoscope sign, which means she was born in either July or August.
However, in the Argentina electoral registers she appears as born on August 19, 1981.

Scalella cited Madonna and Aretha Franklin as her favourite singers.

Filmography

Discography 
 2006 — Rolabogan

References

External links 
 

1981 births
Argentine actresses
21st-century Argentine women singers
Argentine telenovela actresses
Argentine television actresses
Argentine people of Italian descent
Living people